is a passenger railway station located in Hodogaya-ku, Yokohama, Japan, operated by the private railway operator Sagami Railway (Sotetsu).

Lines 
Kami-Hoshikawa Station is served by the Sagami Railway Main Line, and lies 5.0 kilometers from the starting point of the line at Yokohama Station.

Station layout
The station consists of two opposed side platforms connected by a footbridge.

Platforms

Adjacent stations

History 
The station was given its present name on April 1, 1933. The current station building was completed on November 22, 1972.

Passenger statistics
In fiscal 2019, the station was used by an average of 26,007 passengers daily.

The passenger figures for previous years are as shown below.

Surrounding area
 Japan National Route 16
Yokohama City Hodogaya Junior High School
Yokohama City Tokiwadai Elementary School
Yokohama National University

Bus services
Yokohama Municipal Bus (Shiei), Kanagawa Chuo Kotsu (Kanachu), Sagami Railway (Sotetsu)

(North Ent.) bus stop

(Route 16 down side) bus stop

(Route 16 up side) bus stop

See also
 List of railway stations in Japan

References

External links 

  Official home page  

Railway stations in Kanagawa Prefecture
Railway stations in Japan opened in 1926
Railway stations in Yokohama